The 1947 All-Southern Conference football team consists of American football players chosen by the Associated Press (AP) for the All-Southern Conference football team for the 1947 college football season.

All-Southern Conference selections

Backs
 Charlie Justice, North Carolina (AP-1)
 Jack Cloud, William & Mary (AP-1)
 Fred Folger, Jr., Duke (AP-1)
 Lucien Gambino, Maryland (AP-1)

Ends
 Art Weiner, North Carolina (AP-1)
 Robert Steckroth, William & Mary (AP-1)

Tackles
 Len Szafaryn, North Carolina (AP-1)
 Malachi Mills, VMI (AP-1)

Guards
 Knox Ramsey, William & Mary (AP-1)
 Edward Royston, Wake Forest (AP-1)

Centers
 Tommy Thompson, William & Mary (AP-1)

Key
AP = Associated Press

See also
1947 College Football All-America Team

References

All-Southern Conference football team
All-Southern Conference football teams